Iron(II) chromite is an inorganic compound with the chemical formula FeCr2O4.

Preparation
It is created by the sintering of chromium(III) oxide and iron(II) oxide at 1600 °C. It also occurs in nature as the mineral chromite, though with many impurities.

Uses

It is used as a commercial source of chromium and its compounds.  It is also used as a catalyst in the synthesis of hydrogen (H2) from the reaction between carbon monoxide and water vapor.

Safety
Its dust particles may cause irritation; inhalation and ingestion of its dust should be avoided. Swallowing larger amounts may cause injury.

References

Iron(II) compounds
Chromium(III) compounds
Chromium–oxygen compounds